This article aims at showing the evolution of the Angola national basketball team throughout the 1980s, 1990s and 2000s in such competitions as the FIBA Africa Championship, the Olympic Games and the FIBA World Championship.

2011–2017
Angola national basketball team players 2011–2017 A = African championship; = African championship winner;W = World cup

2001–2010
Angola national basketball team players 2001–2010 A = African championship; = African championship winner;W = World cup;O = Olympic tournament

1991–2000
Angola national basketball team players 1991–2000A = African championship; = African championship winner;W = World cup;O = Olympic tournament

1981–1990
Angola national basketball team players 1981–1990 '''A = African championship; = African championship winner;W = World cup

See also
 Angola national basketball team
 Angola national basketball team U18
 Angola national basketball team U16
 BAI Basket
 Federação Angolana de Basquetebol
 List of Angola international footballers
 List of Angola women's national handball team players

References

players